Jack Lawrence (born Jacob Louis Schwartz, April 7, 1912 – March 16, 2009) was an American songwriter.  He was inducted into the Songwriters Hall of Fame in 1975.

Life and career

Jack Lawrence was born in Brooklyn, New York to an Orthodox Jewish family of modest means as the third of four sons. His parents Barney (Beryl) Schwartz and Fanny (Fruma) Goldman Schwartz were first cousins who had run away from their home in Bila Tserkva, Ukraine to go to America in 1904.

Lawrence wrote songs while still a child, but because of parental pressure after he graduated from Thomas Jefferson High School, he enrolled in the First Institute of Podiatry, where he received a D.P.M. degree in 1932. The same year, his first song was published and he immediately decided to make a career of songwriting rather than podiatry. That song, "Play, Fiddle, Play", won international fame and he became a member of ASCAP that year at age 20.

In the early 1940s, Lawrence and several fellow hitmakers formed a sensational review called "Songwriters on Parade", performing all across the Eastern seaboard on the Loew's and Keith circuits.

Lawrence joined the United States Maritime Service during World War II and wrote the official song of the Maritime Service and Merchant Marine, "Heave Ho! My Lads, Heave Ho!" as a lieutenant in 1943, while bandleader at Sheepshead Bay Maritime Service Training Station in New York.

One of Lawrence's first major songs after leaving the service was "Yes, My Darling Daughter", introduced by Dinah Shore on Eddie Cantor's radio program. The song was Shore's first record. His song "If I Didn't Care" introduced the world to The Ink Spots. And although Frank Sinatra was already a well-known big band singer, Lawrence's "All or Nothing at All" was Sinatra's first solo hit.

In 1946, Lawrence published a song he had written during his tour of duty in World War II. It was released in February 1947 and eventually spent 2 weeks at  1. He wrote it for the then-five-year-old daughter of his attorney, Lee Eastman: Linda Eastman, future first wife of Beatle Paul McCartney. The song was called "Linda".

Lawrence also wrote the lyrics for "Tenderly", Sarah Vaughan's first hit and Rosemary Clooney's trademark song (in collaboration with composer Walter Gross), as well as the English language lyrics to "Beyond the Sea" (based on Charles Trenet's French language song "La Mer"), Bobby Darin's signature song. Another French song for which Lawrence wrote English lyrics was "La Goualante de Pauvre Jean", becoming "The Poor People of Paris".

Together with Richard Myers, Lawrence wrote "Hold My Hand", which was featured in the film Susan Slept Here and nominated for the 1954 Academy Award for Best Song.

Lawrence wrote two Disney songs, "Never Smile at a Crocodile" with Frank Churchill’s music, featured as an instrumental in the film Peter Pan, and  "Once Upon a Dream" with Sammy Fain’s music from Sleeping Beauty.

Jack Lawrence collaborated with composer Ray Hartley on songs Dawning of Love, Whispers in the Wind (1958) and Darling, He's Playing Our Song (1959). Ray Hartley (1925-2014) was a world-class Australian pianist, composer, arranger and philanthropist who was resident pianist at many first-class Manhattan hotels. Dawning of Love was featured in Ray Hartley's first album titled after the first track The Trembling of a Leaf (Johnny Green / Jack Lawrence) that also included Lawrence's songs Sleepy Lagoon and With the Wind and the Rain in Your Hair.  Whispers in the Wind was included in Ray Hartley's second album 'For Lovers'.

Work on Broadway

Follow Thru (1929)musical; actor for the role of "Country Club Boy"
Courtin' Time (1951)musical; co-composer and co-lyricist with Don Walker
Ziegfeld Follies of 1957 (1957)revue; featured lyricist for "Bring on the Girls" and "Music for Madame"
Maybe Tuesday (1958)play; co-producer
I Had a Ball (1964)musical; co-composer and co-lyricist
Lena Horne: "The Lady and Her Music" (1981)concert; co-producer
Come Back to the 5 & Dime Jimmy Dean, Jimmy Dean (1982)play; co-producer
The Golden Age (1984)play; owner of the Jack Lawrence Theatre (formerly the Playhouse Theatre)
Quilters (1984)musical; owner of the Jack Lawrence Theatre
So Long on Lonely Street (1986)play; owner of the Jack Lawrence Theatre

Lawrence also wrote the lyrics to "Sleepy Lagoon", a hit by The Platters. The music to "Sleepy Lagoon" was written by Eric Coates in 1940. It was originally a hit for Harry James and his Orchestra in the early 1940s.

Personal life

Lawrence was a gay man and was open about his sexuality later in life. He was the longtime companion of Walter David Myden (birth surname Cohn or Cohen). Myden was born in Cooperstown, New York, in 1915 to Jewish parents who had immigrated from the Russian Empire, much like Lawrence's family. He and Lawrence met while serving in the United States Merchant Marines during World War II. Myden was a psychologist and a social worker at a Los Angeles community council. His UCLA dissertation was published in 1957, on the personalities of creative types, such as composers.

In 1968, Lawrence and Myden made a sizable donation of 20th-century American art to the then-new American Pavilion of Art and Design at the Israel Museum in Jerusalem. The gift was noted in an interview with the couple in The New York Times that made clear that the two were a couple who lived together and were making the donation together, an unusual and brave admission for gay men in pre-Stonewall America.

Myden died suddenly of a heart attack on May 21, 1975, in Los Angeles. Lawrence wrote in his autobiography how surprised and touched he was that his Orthodox Jewish family, which had rarely acknowledged his homosexuality or the existence of their longtime partnership, was gracious and kind to him as he mourned Myden.

In 1979, Lawrence adopted Richard ("Rick") Debnam as his son and heir, since he couldn't legally marry Debnam.

Death

Lawrence died on March 16, 2009, at age 96, after a fall at his home in Redding, Connecticut. 3 weeks short before his 97th birthday.

References

External links 
Jack Lawrence biography 

1912 births
2009 deaths
Musicians from Brooklyn
Accidental deaths from falls
Accidental deaths in Connecticut
American lyricists
American musical theatre composers
American musical theatre lyricists
Broadway composers and lyricists
Jewish American musicians
Jewish American songwriters
LGBT Jews
Gay composers
Gay songwriters
American gay musicians
LGBT people from New York (state)
20th-century American composers
Songwriters from New York (state)
United States Merchant Mariners of World War II
People from Redding, Connecticut
Walt Disney Animation Studios people
American LGBT songwriters
20th-century LGBT people
21st-century LGBT people
American gay writers